Winston Fortuin (born 8 March 1975) is a South African cricketer. He played in three first-class matches for Boland in 1995/96.

See also
 List of Boland representative cricketers

References

External links
 

1975 births
Living people
South African cricketers
Boland cricketers
Cricketers from Paarl